Lagoon Mirim (Portuguese) or Merín (Spanish) is a large estuarine lagoon which extends from southern Rio Grande do Sul state in Brazil into eastern Uruguay. Lagoa Mirim is separated from the Atlantic Ocean by a sandy, partially barren isthmus.

The Jaguarão/Yaguarón, Tacuarí and Cebollatí Rivers empty into Lagoon Mirim, while the São Gonçalo Channel connects it with Lagoa dos Patos to the north.

Location

It is more irregular in outline than its larger neighbor to the north, Lagoa dos Patos, and discharges into the latter through São Gonçalo Channel, which is navigable by small boats.
Both lagoons are the remains of an ancient depression in the coastline shut in by sand beaches built up by the combined action of wind and oceanic currents. They are at the same level as the ocean, but their waters are affected by the tides and are brackish only a short distance above the Rio Grande outlet.

The Taim Ecological Station lies to the east of the lagoon, in the narrow land strip between it and the Atlantic Ocean.
The Jaguarão/Yaguarón River, which forms part of the Brazil-Uruguay boundary line, empties into Lagoon Mirim, and is navigable  up to and beyond the twin towns of Jaguarão (Brazil) and Rio Branco (Uruguay).
On the Uruguayan side apart from the Yaguarón River, the Cebollatí River and the Tacuarí River empty into the Lagoon Mirim. The amount of water received by the lagoon is greater from the Uruguayan side.

See also

 Topography and hydrography of Uruguay
 1851 Boundary Treaty (Brazil–Uruguay)
 Jaguar%C3%A3o River#Navigability

Sources

External links

Mirim
Mirim
Landforms of Rio Grande do Sul
Brazil–Uruguay border
Mirim